Rehearsal is a 2015 film directed by Carl Bessai, starring Bruce Greenwood and Deborah Kara Unger.

The film was shot "in a lovely old theatre in downtown Los Angeles" though set in London.

The film had its world premiere at the Whistler Film Festival as part of a tribute to Greenwood, who received a career achievement award.

References

External links
Official website

Facebook

2015 films
Films directed by Carl Bessai
Films about actors
American independent films
Films shot in Los Angeles
Films set in London
Canadian independent films
Canadian drama films
English-language Canadian films
2010s English-language films
2010s American films
2010s Canadian films